The 2023 season will be Sport Recife's 119th season in the club's history. Sport will be compete in the Campeonato Pernambucano, Copa do Nordeste, Série B and Copa do Brasil.

Current squad

First team

Statistics

Overall
{|class="wikitable"
|-
|Games played || 18 (11 Campeonato Pernambucano, 7 Copa do Nordeste, 0 Copa do Brasil, 0 Campeonato Brasileiro)
|-
|Games won || 13 (8 Campeonato Pernambucano, 5 Copa do Nordeste, 0 Copa do Brasil, 0 Campeonato Brasileiro)
|-
|Games drawn || 4 (3 Campeonato Pernambucano, 1 Copa do Nordeste, 0 Copa do Brasil, 0 Campeonato Brasileiro)
|-
|Games lost || 1 (0 Campeonato Pernambucano, 1 Copa do Nordeste, 0 Copa do Brasil, 0 Campeonato Brasileiro)
|-
|Goals scored || 44
|-
|Goals conceded || 10
|-
|Goal difference || +34
|-
|Best results  || 6–0 (H) v Bahia - Copa do Nordeste - 2023.02.22
|-
|Worst result || 2–3 (A) v Ceará - Copa do Nordeste - 2023.02.14
|-
|Top scorer || Luciano Juba (9)
|-

Goalscorers

Managers performance

Competitions

Overview

Campeonato Pernambucano

First stage

Copa do Nordeste

Group stage

Série B

League table

Results summary

Matches

Copa do Brasil

References

External links

Sport Club do Recife seasons
Sport Recife